Mountain biking in the UK comprises a mix of dedicated mountain bike trail centres and other areas that have become popular with mountain bikers despite lacking dedicated facilities. The main governing body for mountain bike racing in the UK is British Cycling (formerly the British Cycling Federation).

Trail Centres in England

Cumbria and Lancashire
 Grizedale Trail Centre
 Whinlatter Trail Centre

East Midlands
 Eastridge Woods Trail Centre
 Sherwood Pines Trail  Centre

East of England
 Thetford Forest Trail Centre

The North East
 Hansterley Forest Trail Centre
 Kielder Trail Centre

The North West
 Clayton Vale Mountain Bike Trails
 Gisburn Forest Trail Centre

The South East and London
 Aston Hill Mountain Bike Park
 Hadleigh Park Mountain Bike Trail Centre
 Surrey Hills

The South West
 Cannop Cycle Centre (Forest of Dean)
 Haldon Forest Trail Centre
 Lanhydrock Cycle Hub

West Midlands
 Cannock Chase Trail Centre
 Hopton Woods Trail Centre

Yorkshire and the Humber
 Dalby Forest Mountain Bike Trail Centre
 Stainburn Forest Trail Centre

Trail Centres in Scotland

North Scotland
 Glenlivet Trail Centre
 Laggan Wolftrax Trail Centre
 Moray Monster Trail Centre
 Tarland Mountain Bike Trails

South Scotland, collectively known as the 7Stanes sites
 Ae Forest Mountain Bike Trail Centre
 Dalbeattie Trail Centre
 Glentress Trail Centre
 Glentrool Trail Centre
 Innerleithen Mountain Bike Trail Centre
Kirroughtree Trail Centre
 Newcastleton Mountain Bike Trail Centre

Trail Centres in Wales

North Wales
 Antur 'Stiniog Trail Centre
 Coed y Brenin Trail Centre
 Llandegla Trail Centre

Mid Wales
 Bwlch Nant yr Arian Trail Centre
 Coed Trallwm Trail Centre

South Wales
 Afan Forest Park Trail Centre
 Brechfa Trail Centre
 Cwmcarn Trail Centre

Trail Centres in Northern Ireland

 Castle Ward Mountain Bike Trails

British mountain bike manufacturers

Boardman Bikes
Dawes Cycles
Orange Mountain Bikes
Raleigh Bicycle Company
Whyte (Bicycles)
Hope Technology
Airdrop Bikes
Cotic
Starling Cycles
On-One Mountain Bikes
Saracen Bikes
Vitus Bikes
Ragley Bikes
BTR Fabrications
Carbon Wasp
Empire Cycles
Robot Bike Co.
Bird Cycleworks
Dartmoor Bikes

See also
 List of mountain bike areas and trails in the United Kingdom

References

 
Cycling in the United Kingdom